Pascal Edmond (born 19 November 1971) is a French professional golfer.

Edmond was born in Paris, and turned professional in 1991. His brother Olivier is also a professional golfer.

Despite many trips to qualifying school, Edmond never managed to gain full playing status on the European Tour. However, he did play many seasons on the second tier Challenge Tour, and in 2000 won the Aa St Omer Open, finishing with a tournament record lowest final round by a winner, 64, and biggest final round comeback by a winner, 5 shots. That victory accounts for more than half of his career earnings on the two tours combined.

Edmond later moved to Canada where he is the director of the golf academy at Les Quatre Domaines in Mirabel, Quebec.

Professional wins (2)

Challenge Tour wins (1)

Other wins (1)
1997 Grand Prix PGA France

References

External links

French male golfers
European Tour golfers
Golfers from Paris
People from Mirabel, Quebec
1971 births
Living people